The Valentine Building, also known as Valentine's Place and Valentine Business Block, is a historic commercial building at 202 Front Street in Juneau, Alaska.  It is a prominent, irregularly-shaped two-story wood-frame structure, occupying an entire five-sided city block in the historic heart of the city.  It was built in phases in 1904 and 1912 by Emery Valentine, a prominent local businessman who served as mayor of Juneau for six terms.  For the first half of the 20th century, the Valentine building was one of Juneau's preeminent addresses, and the building remains a fine example of Alaskan frontier architecture.

The building was listed on the National Register of Historic Places in 1985 and was included as a contributing property to Juneau Downtown Historic District in 1994.

See also
National Register of Historic Places listings in Juneau, Alaska

References

1904 establishments in Alaska
Buildings and structures completed in 1904
Commercial buildings on the National Register of Historic Places in Alaska
Buildings and structures on the National Register of Historic Places in Juneau, Alaska
Office buildings in Alaska
Retail buildings in Alaska
Historic district contributing properties in Alaska